Sorkhrud (also Romanized as Sorkhrūd, Sorkh Rūd, and Surkhrūd; also known as Sokhrun and Sorkhrūd-e Gharbī) is a city and capital of Sorkhrud District, in Mahmudabad County, Mazandaran Province, Iran. At the 2006 census, its population was 6,569, in 1,841 families.

References

Populated places in Mahmudabad County

Cities in Mazandaran Province